Odense University Hospital (OUH) is the largest and most specialized hospital in Southern Denmark.
 
OUH is both Odense's and Funen's largest single workplace (Odense Municipality employs significantly more, but they are spread over many addresses). It has a budget of 835 million Euro and has 11.000 employees. 

OUH acts as a local and acute hospital in the northern part of Funen, but takes patients from all over Denmark, as it has highly specialized units within hand replantation surgery and special neuro-radiological intervention. In addition to reading Driver, OUH has an extensive research activity, and annually trains 2.500 people as part of either basic or continuing education.

Hospital Pharmacy Fyn is located at the university hospital. From the university hospital area there is a walkway to the Odense Sygehus Station operated by Svendborgbanen.

OUH has for several years had the organizational Middelfart Hospital under it, but since 2008 also the former hospitals under the organizational name Funen Hospital, which are the County of Funen's smaller hospitals, became part of OUH. This concerns Svendborg Hospital, Dagklinik Faaborg, Hospital Unit Nyborg, Hospital Unit Ringe and Hospital Unit Aero.

New OUH 

The Region of Southern Denmark is building a new university hospital in the south of Odense. It will be the largest hospital in Denmark built from scratch, and it is expected to be finished in 2022. 

The New OUH will be physically connected to the University of Southern Denmark and thereby underline the close ties between research and the everyday workflow at the hospital and the needs of the patients.

Patient statistics 
 485.833 outpatient visits per. year (2006)
 Approx. 75.000 hospitalized patients, which together spend about 340,000 bed days per year (2006)
 Approx. 55.000 emergency room visits per year
 1225

References

External links 
 Odense University Hospital's website

Hospital buildings completed in 1957
Hospital
Hospitals in Denmark
Skyscrapers in Denmark